20-Solagii Istiqloliyati Tojikiston (literal translation: "20 years independence of Tajikistan", formerly: Komsomolobod) is a jamoat in Tajikistan. It is located in Farkhor District in Khatlon Region. The jamoat has a total population of 14,736 (2015).

References

Populated places in Khatlon Region
Jamoats of Tajikistan